Buls may refer to:
 Buls Bay, Antarctica
 Charles Buls (1837–1914), Belgian politician, mayor of Brussels
 Boston University Literary Society

See also 
 Bul (disambiguation)
 Bulls (disambiguation)